The  was a railway line in Karafuto Prefecture during the days of the Empire of Japan. It ran  from Konuma Station on the East Coast Line to Kawakami Coal Mine Station.

Route
As published by the Ministry of Railways, as of 1 October 1937 the stations of the Kawakami Line were as follows:

Russian era 

This line continue operating by MPS/RZD, end stations were renamed to Novoaleksandrovka and Sinegorsk. Passenger service closed in 1997. Coal mines closed in 2004. Last train was circa 2006. Line was dismantled in 2016-2018.

See also
 Hōshin Line
 Chihaku ferry

References

Karafuto
History of rail transport in Japan